Iwantja is a Central Australian Indigenous band from Indulkana in the APY lands formed in 2002. The band sings in Pitjantjatjara/Yankunytjatjara. They won the 2011 Deadly Award for Most Promising New Talent in Music.

Discography

References

Indigenous Australian musical groups
South Australian musical groups